Steven Müller (born 15 September 1990) is a German track and field athlete. He competed in the men's 200 metres event at the 2019 World Athletics Championships.

References

External links

1990 births
Living people
Place of birth missing (living people)
German male sprinters
World Athletics Championships athletes for Germany
German national athletics champions
Athletes (track and field) at the 2020 Summer Olympics
Olympic athletes of Germany